Fuego (English: Fire) is the fourth studio album and eighth album by Mexican-American cumbia group A.B. Quintanilla y Los Kumbia Kings and the fourth studio album by Mexican-American musician A.B. Quintanilla. It was released on October 5, 2004, by EMI Latin. The premium edition was released on December 6, 2005. It has all the songs from the standard edition plus "Sabes a Chocolate", "Baila Esta Kumbia", a live version of "Na Na Na (Dulce Niña)" and a DVD that includes 5 music videos.

Track listing

DVD

Personnel
Kumbia Kings
 A.B. Quintanilla III – bass guitar, backing vocals, producer, composer
 Fernando "Nando" Domínguez III – vocals
 Frankie "Pangie" Pangelinan – vocals
 Abel Talamántez – vocals
 Irvin "Pee Wee" Salinas – vocals
 Anthony "Nino B" López – backing vocals, dancer
 Juan Jesús "JP" Peña – backing vocals, dancer
 Cruz Martínez – keyboards, producer, composer
 Chris Pérez – guitar
 Robert "BoBBo" Gomez III – keyboards
 Noe "Gipper" / "El Animal" Nieto Jr. – accordion
 Robert "Robbie" Del Moral – drums
 Luigi Giraldo – keyboards, composer

Additional musicians and personnel
 Jorge "Pekas" Caballero – percussion
 Campa – accordion
 Luis Conte – percussion
 Belinda Peregrín – vocals
 Noel Schajris of Sin Bandera – vocals

Sales and certifications

References

2004 albums
Kumbia Kings albums
A. B. Quintanilla albums
Albums produced by A.B. Quintanilla
Albums produced by Cruz Martínez
EMI Latin albums
Spanish-language albums
Cumbia albums
Albums recorded at Q-Productions